Laura Jackson may refer to:
Laura Jackson (cricketer), English cricketer
Laura Jackson (footballer) (born 1991), English-born Jamaican footballer and coach
Laura Riding Jackson or Laura Riding (1901–1991), American writer
Laura Jackson (presenter) (born 1986), British television presenter of UK game show Take Me Out: The Gossip

See also
Lara Jackson (born 1986), American swimmer
Lauren Jackson (born 1981), Australian basketball player